Mansein is a village in the east of Homalin Township, Hkamti District, in the Sagaing Region of northwestern Burma. It is located near the border with Kachin State.

References

External links
Maplandia World Gazetteer

Populated places in Hkamti District
Homalin Township